Jillian T. Dempsey (born January 19, 1991) is an American ice hockey player who currently captains the Boston Pride in the Premier Hockey Federation (PHF). She currently holds the all-time PHF records for games played, goals, assists, and points, and has won both the Clarkson Cup and the Isobel Cup.

Career 
She played for the Harvard Crimson women's ice hockey team from 2009 to 2013, serving as team captain in her final season. Across 129 NCAA games, she scored 148 points, finishing in the top-10 all-time scorers for Harvard and being named a top-10 finalist for the 2013 Patty Kazmaier Award.

In August 2013, she was selected as the 10th overall pick by the Boston Blades in the 2013 CWHL Draft. In October 2013, Dempsey joined the Bisons de Neuilly-sur-Marne on loan for the first round of the 2013–14 IIHF European Women's Champions Cup, where she scored 13 points in 3 games.

She was awarded the CWHL's Rookie of the Year Award in 2014 after leading all American-born players in league scoring. The following season, she scored 19 points in 22 games as the Blades won the 2015 Clarkson Cup.

When the NWHL was formed in 2015, Dempsey left the Blades to join the Boston Pride. In 2018, she was named Pride captain.

Dempsey participated in the 3rd NWHL All-Star Game. She played for Team Stecklein in the 2019 NWHL All-Star Game, and served as captain for Team Dempsey at the 2020 NWHL All-Star Game. On Sunday, January 26, 2020, Jillian Dempsey became the first player in league history to reach 100 career points, including playoffs. She reached the century mark with an assist in a win versus the Minnesota Whitecaps.

In February 2020, Sportsnet named her one of the 25 most powerful women in hockey. She shared the 2020 NWHL MVP award with Allie Thunstrom, as the Pride finished as regular season champions. The team made it to the finals of the 2020 Isobel cup before the playoffs were cancelled due to the COVID-19 pandemic.

During the 2020–21 NWHL season in Lake Placid, Dempsey injured her shoulder and played through it until the 2-week season was terminated. When the playoffs resumed in Boston in March, she was again at full health and captained the Pride to their second Isobel Cup Championship as the only remaining player from the first win in 2016.

On December 12, 2022, Dempsey tied a PHF record with six points on Sunday including her first career hat-trick to lead Boston in a 7-5 win versus Buffalo.

International 

Dempsey has represented the United States women's national ice hockey team at the 2009 IIHF World Women's U18 Championship and the 2011 4 Nations Cup. She would again play for the US at the 2012 IIHF Women's World Championship, winning a silver medal.

Personal life 

She is a graduate of the Rivers School and Harvard College, where she majored in Classics.  During her time at Harvard, she lived in Canaday Hall in her freshman year, and later in Pforzheimer House. After completing a master's in education, she joined the Teach For America programme. In 2016, she became a fifth grade teacher in her home town of Winthrop, Massachusetts. She continued teaching while playing in the NWHL, including conducting class from her hotel room during the 2020–21 Lake Placid bubble.

When she was nine, she won a contest to name the Boston Bruins mascot, Blades the Bruin. Her father, Jack Dempsey, currently serves as the Boston Fire Department commissioner.

Career stats

Source

Honours and Championships 

Boston Bruins John Carlton Award (2009)
 Harvard Athlete of the Week (Week of February 6, 2012)
4x ECAC Player of the Week (Weeks of December 12, 2011, February 6 and 28, 2012, January 7, 2013)
ECAC Rookie of the Week (Week of November 16, 2010)
2010 ECAC All-Rookie Team
2010-11 All-ECAC
2010 Second Team All-Ivy
2013-14 CWHL Rookie of the Year
2013-14 CWHL All-Rookie Team
2013-14 Leading scorer among CWHL rookies
2018, 2019, and 2020 NWHL All-Star Teams 
2017-18 and 2018-19 NWHL Denna Laing Award
2019-20 NWHL Most Valuable Player Award
2019-20 NWHL Leading Scorer

References

External links
 
 
 Boston Blades profile
 Harvard Crimson profile
 

1991 births
Living people
American women's ice hockey forwards
Boston Blades players
Boston Pride players
Clarkson Cup champions
Harvard Crimson women's ice hockey players
Harvard College alumni
Ice hockey players from Massachusetts
Isobel Cup champions
Premier Hockey Federation players
People from Winthrop, Massachusetts
Rivers School alumni